Below it the list of  hillforts in Lithuania. The first three volumes of the atlas of Lithuanian hillforts (Lietuvos piliakalniai. Atlasas, eds. Z. Baubonis ir G. Zabiela, Vilnius, 2005, vol. I–III) contained 829 entries. The 4th volume (2017) contained additional  92 entries. Most of the latter ones were identified after 2005, but some of the sites were known earlier, and only recently they were classified as hillforts. At the end of vol. 4 there is a list of hillforts grouped by districts and municipalities.  only 184 of them were excavated to various extents.

"Hillfort" is piliakalnis in Lithianian. The word literally means "castle mound" and refers to wooden castles that stood on tops of these mounds. Since 14th century, with the appearance of brick and stone castles, the wooden ones were abandoned and decayed, and today the root "pilis" in "piliakalnis" refers to a castle only etymologically. In modern times, about one and half thousand places are called piliakalnis, not all of them are real hillforts (defined as elements of terrain with external earth fortifications of closed type with traces of the activity of ancient people within). A number of similar-looking objects are not hillforts in the archaeological sense, but rather temporary field fortifications, remnants of fortified manors, etc., dated by XVI-XVII centuries.

Detailed information about Lithuanian hillforts is collected at the website Lietuvos Piliakalniai ("Lithuanian Hillforts"), a virtual database maintained by the Cultural Heritage Preservation Force. The database can be browsed by districts and its texts are searchable.

The  information about the  protection status of hillforts and further references can be found in the overall .

See also:

Akmenė District

Alytus

Alytus District

Anykščiai District

Birštonas Municipality

Biržai District

Druskininkai Municipality

Elektrėnai Municipality

Ignalina District

Jonava District

Joniškis District

Jurbarkas District

Kaišiadorys District

Kalvarija Municipality

Kaunas

Kaunas District

Kazlų Rūda Municipality

Kėdainiai District

Kelmė District

Klaipėda

Klaipėda District

Kretinga District

Kupiškis District

Lazdijai District

Marijampolė Municipality

Mažeikiai District

Molėtai District

Pagėgiai Municipality

Pakruojis District

Palanga

Panevėžys District

Pasvalys District

Plungė District

Prienai District

Radviliškis District

Raseiniai District

Rietavas Municipality

Rokiškis District

Skuodas District

Šakiai District

Šalčininkai District

Šiauliai District

Šilalė District

Šilutė District

Širvintos District

Švenčionys District

Tauragė District

Telšiai District

Trakai District

Ukmergė District

Utena District

Varėna District

Vilkaviškis District

Vilnius

Vilnius District

Visaginas Municipality

Zarasai District

Hillfort groups /complexes
 Kernavė Mounds by Kernavė:
 Lizdeikos kalnas
 Mindaugo sosto kalnas
 Aukuro kalnas
 Pilies kalnas
 Kriveikiškio piliakalnis
  Sudargas hillforts; :lt:Sudargo piliakalniai:
 Balnakalnis
 Pilaitė
 Vorpilis
 Žydkapiai
 Burgaičių III piliakalnis
 Gandingos piliakalniai:
 Pilies kalnas
 Ožkupris
 Nausodžio I piliakalnis
 Nausodžio II piliakalnis
 Varkalių piliakalnis
 Vilniaus piliakalniai:
 Gedimino kalnas
 Stalo kalnas
 Bekešo kalnas
 Plikasis kalnas
 Gedimino kapo kalnas

See also
List of hillforts in Latvia

References

External links
 Lietuvos piliakalnių atlasas
 Map of Lithuanian hillforts

 
Lithuania